is an actor, fight choreographer and a former member of Japanese boy band V6, which was under the management of Johnny & Associates. He joined Johnny & Associates at the age of 14.

Music career 
In the summer of 1995, Okada participated in Johnny's Pre-School, part of the NTV program . He passed the audition and joined Johnny & Associates at the age of 14. After being in Johnny's for only a short period of three months, he made his debut as the youngest member of the idol group V6. Unlike the rest of the members in the group, he did not have much experience as Johnny's Jr. The first time that he had been on a music program was only after the debut of V6. Their debut song was "Music For the People".

Okada can play the guitar, as well as the piano. His mother is a piano teacher. His voice is in the middle range, and hence his solos usually include slower ballads. Recently, he has been given longer solos in V6 songs, such as "Way of Life". He also reveals that during V6's 2008 concert Vibes, he was directing most of the lightning, staging, and costumes.

Acting career

Dramas 
Beside being a V6 member, Okada is an accomplished actor with eleven movies, in eight of which he plays the lead, and sixteen dramas, in four of which he plays the lead. In a Shounen Club Premium interview on May 7, 2009, he revealed that it was the Japanese drama Kisarazu Cat's Eye that caught the attention of viewers and directors, and made them aware of his acting ability. The success of the drama led to the making of two movie sequels, Kisarazu Cat's Eye: Nihon Series and Kisarazu Cat's Eye: World Series. His other notable dramas include Tiger & Dragon, a comedy drama about rakugo, a form of Japanese comedy acted only by one person telling that story. and SP (also known as Security Police), an action suspense drama about a team of security police bodyguards in charge of protecting important people in the government. With Shinichi Tsutsumi as his co-star, the drama drew in overall ratings of 15.35% despite its Saturday 11:00 p.m. (JST) time slot; its special episode broadcast in 2008 also received a viewership rating of 21.5%.

After several years of "drama hiatus", it has been announced in 2012 that Okada would play the main character, Kuroda Kanbei, in the 2014 NHK historical drama, set to air in January of that year. Kanbei was a man of ambition who served as the chief strategist under Toyotomi Hideyoshi in the Sengoku period.

Movies 
He made a big leap in his movie career with Tokyo Tower in 2005. In the movie he portrayed a young college student torn between his love for a lady twenty years his senior and the views society has on these kinds of relationship. After that came Hana, directed by Hirokazu Kore-eda. In the movie, Okada portrayed Sōza, a samurai uninterested in killing his enemy and focused on what he could do today to be a better person instead. The movie earned him a nomination for the Blue Ribbon Awards, but he declined this nomination. Nevertheless, he was awarded the Ishihara Yujiro New Actor Award at Nikkan Sports Film Award for his role in Hana.

In 2012, Okada played the role Shibukawa Shunkai, an astronomer who invented the Jōkyō calendar used for many decades, in the movie Tenchi: The Samurai Astronomer directed by Yōjirō Takita. The director has previously won an Academy Award for Best Foreign Language Film, Departures, in 2009. Later that year, it was announced that Okada would appear in another film set for a spring 2013 release, The Eternal Zero, directed by Takashi Yamazaki. The film follows the journey of a kamikaze pilot named Kyuzo Miyabe, a man described as a coward who volunteered to die for his country.

Personal life 
Okada is known for being reserved. He does not meet with many people within the agency. In an interview on Shounen Club Premium, Okada said that when he was little, whenever his name was called up to read something in class, he would feel like vomiting and purposely avoided school on those days. Within V6, he is also the most quiet person. He enjoys carpentry and has carved wooden bears for children.

In 2010, Okada had reported in a press conference that he is certified to teach Jeet Kune Do and Kali in Japan, the latter was used by him as his main martial art when the SP series was filmed.

He married Aoi Miyazaki on 23 December 2017.

In May 2018, it was announced that he and his wife are expecting their first child. He is the fourth member of V6 to be a father.

Announced via fax message, his son was born in October 2018.

Filmography

Film

TV dramas

TV anime

Other television

Japanese dub

Awards and nominations

References

External links 
 
 
 Profile @ Johnny's net

1980 births
Living people
Johnny & Associates
Japanese hip hop singers
Japanese male pop singers
Avex Group artists
Japanese male film actors
Japanese male television actors
Japanese male child actors
People from Hirakata
Japanese Jeet Kune Do practitioners
Japanese eskrimadors
20th-century Japanese male actors
20th-century Japanese male singers
21st-century Japanese male actors
21st-century Japanese male singers
Musicians from Osaka Prefecture
Taiga drama lead actors
Horikoshi High School alumni